Events from the year 1938 in Sweden

Incumbents
 Monarch – Gustaf V
 Prime Minister – Per Albin Hansson

Events

 20 December – The Saltsjöbaden Agreement was signed between the Swedish Trade Union Confederation and the Swedish Employers Association.

Births
2 April – John Larsson, 17th General of The Salvation Army
11 June – Leif Axmyr, convicted murderer (d. 2018)
20 September – Pia Lindström, television journalist

Full date missing
 Per Odensten, novelist.

Deaths

 5 February – Axel Ljung, gymnast (born 1884).
 14 April – Gillis Grafström, figure skater (born 1893).
 31 October – August Gustafsson, tug-of-war competitor (born 1875).
 Alexandra Skoglund, suffragette, women's rights activist and politician (born 1862)
 Augusta Andersson, restaurant owner (born 1856)

References

 
Sweden
Years of the 20th century in Sweden